Odostomia plicata is a species of sea snail, a marine gastropod mollusc in the family Pyramidellidae, the pyrams and their allies.

Description
The thin shell is transparent and polished. Its length measures 2.5 mm. It is marked with microscopic spiral striae. Its color is very pale yellowish white or white, darker at the suture. There are 5 to 6 whorls in the teleoconch. The sutures are moderately impressed. There is no umbilicus or a narrow chink in full-grown specimens. The columellar tooth is small, but distinct.

Distribution
This species occurs in the following locations:
 British Isles
 European waters (ERMS scope)
 Greek Exclusive Economic Zone
 Irish Exclusive economic Zone
 Portuguese Exclusive Economic Zone
 South West Coast of Apulia
 Spanish Exclusive Economic Zone
 United Kingdom Exclusive Economic Zone

References

External links
 To Biodiversity Heritage Library (93 publications)
 To CLEMAM
 To Encyclopedia of Life
 To Marine Species Identification Portal
 To USNM Invertebrate Zoology Mollusca Collection
 To ITIS
 To World Register of Marine Species

plicata
Gastropods described in 1803